Professor Geoffrey Alan Parker FRS (born  24 May 1944) is an emeritus professor of biology at the University of Liverpool and the 2008 recipient of the Darwin Medal. Parker has been called “the professional’s professional”.

He has a particular interest in behavioural ecology and evolutionary biology, and is most noted for introducing the concept of sperm competition in 1970. 
Much of his work from the 1970s onwards has related to the application of game theory (theory of games) to various biological problems, using the evolutionarily stable strategy (ESS) approach pioneered by John Maynard Smith and George Price. 
With R. R. Baker and V. G. F. Smith in 1972, he proposed a leading theory for the evolution of anisogamy and two sexes, and in 1979 made the first theoretical analysis of sexual conflict in evolution. He has also investigated the evolution of competitive mate searching, animal distributions, animal fighting, coercion, intrafamilial conflict, complex life cycles, and several other topics.

Life
Parker was educated at Lymm Grammar School in Lymm, Cheshire, and gained his BSc from University of Bristol in 1965, from where he also gained a doctorate in 1969 under H.E. Hinton, FRS (1912–1977). His Ph.D. was on The reproductive behaviour and the nature of sexual selection in Scatophaga stercoraria L. (yellow dung fly), and provided a detailed quantitative test of Darwin's theory of sexual selection, and an early application of optimality theory in biology.

At this time, most ethologists and ecologists interpreted adaptations in terms of "survival value to the species"".  However, the paradigm shift of the gene-centric view of evolution (popularised by Richard Dawkins in The Selfish Gene) shortly afterwards overturned this idea: mainstream views in behavioural ecology and sociobiology saw natural selection restored to Darwinian principles in terms of survival value to the individual (and its kin). Parker's work played a part in this shift and in the early development of behavioural ecology.

He moved to the University of Liverpool in 1968, where he became a lecturer in zoology.

In 1978, he was a senior research fellow in the Research Centre at King's College, Cambridge University, returning to Liverpool in 1979.  He became a professor in 1989 on election to the Royal Society,  
In 1996, he became the Derby Chair of Zoology, retiring in 2009, but remaining as emeritus professor and continuing scientific research (as of 2014).
In 2005, he won the Frink Medal, of the Zoological Society of London.
In 2008, he won the Darwin Medal: 
He has been awarded the degrees of Doctor of Science, honoris causa by the University of Bristol. in 2011, and by the Memorial University of Newfoundland in 2018.

See also
 Evolutionarily stable strategy
 Resource holding potential
 Sperm competition
 Sexual conflict

References

External links
 

English zoologists
British evolutionary biologists
1944 births
Living people
Fellows of the Royal Society
Fellows of King's College, Cambridge
Alumni of the University of Bristol
Academics of the University of Liverpool
20th-century British zoologists
People from Lymm